The Men's team sprint event of the 2015 UCI Track Cycling World Championships was held on 18 February 2015.

Results

Qualifying
The qualifying was held at 20:20.

Finals
The finals were started at 21:35.

References

Men's team sprint
UCI Track Cycling World Championships – Men's team sprint